Berteaucourt-lès-Thennes is a commune in the Somme department in Hauts-de-France in northern France.

Geography
The soil around the town comprises alluvial deposits in the valley of the Luce, the small river that separates Berteaucourt from Thennes, red diluvium around the school and out towards Thézy-Glimont, chalk towards the slopes and Eocene clay on the higher ground.

Population

History
Being very close to the front line during much of World War I 1914–1918, the town was all but destroyed. Every building, as well as the cemetery, suffered a great deal of damage. General Seely set up his headquarters at Berteaucourt-lès-Thennes in March, 1918. On 8 August 1918 the French troops left Thennes and Berteaucourt-lès-Thennes, counter-attacking towards Villers-aux-Érables.

See also
Communes of the Somme department

References

Communes of Somme (department)